Okan is a Canadian Afro-Cuban jazz group, whose core members are Cuban Canadian musicians Elizabeth Rodriguez and Magdelys Savigne. They are most noted for their 2020 album Espiral, which won the Juno Award for World Music Album of the Year at the Juno Awards of 2021.

They were previously nominated in the same category at the Juno Awards of 2020 for their 2019 debut album Sombras.

Rodriguez and Savigne are both former members of Jane Bunnett's band Maqueque, who left that band in 2017 to form Okan. They perform both as a duo, and as leaders of a larger combo featuring session musicians.

References

Canadian world music groups
Canadian jazz ensembles
Musical groups from Toronto
Juno Award for Global Music Album of the Year winners